UV curing (ultraviolet curing) is the process by which ultraviolet light is used to initiate a photochemical reaction that generates a crosslinked network of polymers. UV curing is  adaptable to printing, coating, decorating, stereolithography, and in the assembly of a variety of products and materials. In comparison to other technologies, curing with UV energy may be considered a low-temperature process, a high-speed process, and is a solventless process, as cure occurs via direct polymerization rather than by evaporation. Originally introduced in the 1960s, this technology has streamlined and increased automation in many industries in the manufacturing sector.

Applications 
UV curing is used in applications where there is a need for converting or curing inks, adhesives, and coatings. UV-cured adhesive has become a high speed replacement for two-part adhesives, eliminating the need for solvent removal, ratio mixing, and potential life concern. It can be used in the flexographic, offset, pad, and screen printing processes, where UV curing systems are used to polymerize images on screen-printed products, ranging from T-shirts to 3D and cylindrical parts. It is used in fine instrument finishing (guitars, violins, ukuleles, etc.), pool cue manufacturing and other wood craft industries. Printing with UV curable inks provides the ability to print on a very wide variety of substrates such as plastics, paper, canvas, glass, metal, foam boards, tile, films, and many other materials.

Other industries that take advantage of UV curing include medicine, automobiles, cosmetics (for example artificial fingernails and gel nail polish), food, science, education, and art. UV curable inks have met the requirements of the publication sector on a variety of papers and boards.

Advantages of UV curing 
A primary advantage of curing with ultraviolet light is the speed at which a material can be processed. Speeding up the curing or drying step in a process can reduce flaws and errors by decreasing time that an ink or coating spends wet. This can increase the quality of a finished item, and potentially allow for greater consistency. Another benefit to decreasing manufacturing time is that less space needs to be devoted to storing items which can not be used until the drying step is finished.

Because UV energy has unique interactions with many different materials, UV curing allows for the creation of products with characteristics not achievable via other means. This has led to UV curing becoming fundamental in many fields of manufacturing and technology, where changes in strength, hardness, durability, chemical resistance, and many other properties are required.

Types of UV curing lamps

Medium-pressure lamps
Medium-pressure mercury-vapor lamps have historically been the industry standard for curing products with ultraviolet light. The bulbs work by sending an electric discharge to excite a mixture of mercury and noble gases, generating a plasma. Once the mercury reaches a plasma state, it irradiates a high spectral output in the UV region of the electromagnetic spectrum. Major peaks in light intensity occur in the 240-270 nm and 350-380 nm regions. These intense peaks, when matched with the absorption profile of a photoinitiator, cause the rapid curing of materials. By modifying the bulb mixture with different gases and metal halides, the distribution of wavelength peaks can be altered, and material interactions are changed.

Medium-pressure lamps can either be standard gas-discharge lamps or electrodeless lamps, and typically use an elongated bulb to emit energy. By incorporating optical designs such an elliptical or even aconic reflector, light can either be focused or projected over a far distance. These lamps can often operate at over 900 degrees Celsius and produce UV energy levels over 10 W/cm2.

Low-pressure lamps

Low-pressure mercury-vapor lamps generate primarily 254 nm 'UVC' energy, and are most commonly used in disinfection applications. Operated at lower temperatures and with less voltage than medium-pressure lamps, they, like all UV sources, require shielding when operated to prevent excess exposure of skin and eyes.

UV LED
Since development of the aluminium gallium nitride LED in the early 2000s, UV LED technology has seen sustained growth in the UV curing marketplace. Generating energy most efficiently in the 365-405 nm 'UVA' wavelengths, continued technological advances, have allowed for improved electrical efficiency of UV LEDs as well as significant increases in output. UV LED lamps generate high energy directed to a specific area which strengthen the uniformity. Benefiting from lower-temperature operation and the lack of hazardous mercury, UV LEDs have replaced medium-pressure lamps in many applications. Major limitations include difficulties in designing optics for curing on complex three-dimensional objects, and poor efficiency at generating lower-wavelength energy, though development work continues.

See also
 Photopolymer
 UV stabilizers in plastics
 Weather testing of polymers

References

Curing agents
Ultraviolet radiation